The canton of Saint-Dizier-1 is an administrative division of the Haute-Marne department, northeastern France. It was created at the French canton reorganisation which came into effect in March 2015. Its seat is in Saint-Dizier.

It consists of the following communes:
 
Allichamps
Éclaron-Braucourt-Sainte-Livière
Hallignicourt
Humbécourt
Laneuville-au-Pont
Louvemont
Moëslains
Perthes
Saint-Dizier (partly)
Valcourt
Villiers-en-Lieu

References

Cantons of Haute-Marne